Manu Leumann (1889–1977) was a Swiss Indo-Europeanist, son of Indologist Ernst Leumann. He was Reader at Munich University 1922-1926, and professor for Indo-European studies at Zürich University 1927-1959.

Publications

 Lateinische Laut- und Formenlehre 1927; 2nd ed. 1977
 Homerische Wörter 1950
 Morphologische Neuerungen im altindischen Verbalsystem 1952
 Kleine Schriften 1959, eds. H. Haffter, E. Risch, W. Rüegg

References
 Bernhard Forssman, Gnomon 49 (1977)
 J. Gonda, Jaarboek v. d. Kon. Nederlandse Akademie van Wetenschappen 1977, 1-5
 Heinz Haffter, Neue Zürcher Zeitung, 6. Okt. 1969 = Et in Arcadia ego 123-6
 Heinz Haffter, "Manu Leumann und der Thesaurus Linguae Latinae", Museum Helveticum 38 (1981) 268ff.
 Heinz Haffter, Neue Deutsche Biographie 14 (1985), 375
 Karl Hoffmann, Jahrbuch der Bayer. Akad. d. Wissenschaften 1978
 Wolfgang Meid, Almanach der Oesterr. Akad. d. Wissenschaften 127 (1977)
 Ernst Risch, Jahresbericht der Universität Zürich 1977/8, 85-7
 Ernst Risch, 23 (1978), 213-22 (mit Bibliographie)

External links
Short biography at the LMU

Indo-Europeanists
Linguists of Indo-European languages
Academic staff of the University of Zurich
1889 births
1977 deaths
Swiss expatriates in Germany